4-Ethylbenzaldehye is a derivative of benzaldehyde.

References 

Benzaldehydes